Offerton may refer to:

Offerton, Derbyshire
Offerton, Greater Manchester
Offerton (Stockport electoral ward)
Offerton, Tyne and Wear